Elena Vyacheslavovna Perova (born 24 June 1976 in Moscow, RSFSR, USSR) is a Russian singer and musician, TV presenter, actress. She was a former member of the Russian musical groups Litsey  (1991–1997) and   Amega  (1998–1999). She won the Golden Gramophone Award in 1996 and TEFI in 2008. Since 2013, she has been chief editor of the Department of Music and Entertainment Programs in Channel One Russia.

Personal life
She describes herself as a bisexual. 
Her maternal half-brother is Sergei Suponev.

Selected filmography
In Motion (2002)
Gloss (2007)

References

External links
 Official website
  Видео-канал группы «Лицей» на сайте YouTube 
 
   Галерея Playboy 
    
  Официальный сайт союза телеведущих. Елена Перова. // televeduschie.ru 
  Апрель — Большая снайперская энциклопедия. Лена Перова  — певица, актриса, телеведущая, автор-исполнитель собственных песен.  // aprelpp.ru

1976 births
Living people
Russian pop singers
Russian singer-songwriters
Russian composers
Singers from Moscow
Russian women singer-songwriters
Russian television presenters
Russian columnists
Actresses from Moscow
Russian actresses
21st-century Russian singers
21st-century Russian women singers
Bisexual women
Bisexual musicians
Bisexual actresses
Russian LGBT musicians
Russian women columnists
Russian women television presenters
20th-century LGBT people
21st-century LGBT people
Moscow State University of Economics, Statistics, and Informatics alumni